, sometimes called , (April 18, 1869 – February 25, 1927) was a Japanese artist of the Meiji period. He was a student and adopted son of Tsukioka Yoshitoshi, and also studied with Ogata Gekkō. Although Kōgyo sometimes painted other subjects, for most of his career he made pictures of Japanese noh theatre, either as large-scale paintings or colored woodblock prints. Many of the latter were published in series and sold as multi-volume sets. Some sets, such as Nōgaku zue, have been preserved as albums in their original bindings, including accordion-style bindings known as orihon, while other sets such as Nōga taikan, were issued in sewn bindings known as yamato toji. Although most bound sets belong to institutional collections, individual prints by Kōgyo can still be found through dealers specializing in Japanese prints.

References
Mizuta Museum of Art (2005). Kindai no Nōgakka: Tsukioka Kōgyo ten. Tōgane-shi: Jōsai Kokusai Daigaku Mizuta Bijutsukan.
Merritt, Helen and Nanako Yamada (1992). Guide to Modern Japanese Prints: 1900-1975. Honolulu: University of Hawai'i Press.
Bondi, Don. "Tsukioka Kôgyo and Nô Ukioyo-e." Daruma 52, Vol.13, no.4 (Autumn 2006), 12–24.
Schaap, Robert and J. Thomas Rimer (2010). The Beauty of Silence: Japanese Nō and Nature Prints by Tsukioka Kōgyo 1869-1927. Leiden: Hotei Publishing.

External links

Image from 'Nōgaku Zue' at the Walters Art Museum
Kōgyo prints at the Art Institute of Chicago
Kōgyo prints at the Ruth Chandler Williamson Gallery
Kōgyo prints at the Los Angeles County Museum of Art
Kōgyo prints at the Frick Art & Historical Center
Kōgyo prints at the University of Pittsburgh

1869 births
1927 deaths
Ukiyo-e artists
People of Meiji-period Japan
Artists from Tokyo
19th-century Japanese painters
20th-century Japanese painters
20th-century printmakers